Cyr may refer to:

 Cyr (album) by The Smashing Pumpkins
 Cyr, Montana, United States
 Cyr Plantation, Maine, United States
 Cyr wheel, an acrobatic device
 Colonia Airport (IATA: CYR), Colonia Department, Uruguay

People with the surname
 Anne Marie Cyr (born 1963), Canadian singer
 Conrad K. Cyr (1931–2016), American senior judge 
 Denis Cyr (born 1961), Canadian ice hockey player
 Éric Cyr (born 1979), Canadian baseball player
 Frank W. Cyr (1900–1995), American educator and author
 Jean-Paul Cyr (born 1965), American racing driver
 Josh Cyr, American musician and founder of band The World Is a Beautiful Place & I Am No Longer Afraid to Die
 Lili St. Cyr (1918–1999), American striptease artist
 Louis Cyr (1863–1912), Canadian strongman
 Myriam Cyr (born 1960), Canadian actress and author
 Paul Cyr (1963–2012), Canadian ice hockey player
 Tyler Cyr (born 1993), American baseball player
 Vincent Cyr, American media personality and member of gaming organization One True King

See also
 Saint-Cyr (disambiguation)
 Saint Cyricus
 Cyrillic script